Telphusa smaragdopis is a moth of the family Gelechiidae. It is found in Costa Rica.

The wingspan is 15–17 mm. The forewings are dark purplish-fuscous with a metallic-green spot resting on the base of the dorsum and an oblique white fascia from the costa at one-fourth to the dorsum, its lower two-thirds occupied, except on the anterior edge, by a metallic-green blotch, and preceded by a triangular blackish dorsal blotch of rough scales. Black spots represent the stigmata, with some tufts of scales, or these are merged in a discal patch of black suffusion, beneath this a grey-whitish dorsal streak from the fascia to near the tornus, marked with a metallic-green subdorsal spot beneath the middle of the wing, and another towards the tornus with some metallic-green discal irroration above it. There is a short outwards-oblique black streak from the tornus, beneath its apex some metallic-green suffusion. The posterior part of the costa and termen are dotted with ochreous-whitish irroration. The hindwings are grey, becoming subhyaline on the basal half, with the veins dark grey.

References

Moths described in 1926
Telphusa
Taxa named by Edward Meyrick